Granville Country Park is a local nature reserve near Telford in Shropshire, England. It is owned by Telford and Wrekin Council, who work in partnership with the Shropshire Wildlife Trust and Friends of Granville.

Description
The reserve, area , contains former industrial sites, since reclaimed by nature. There is woodland, meadows, a marsh and open water; former pit mounds are now grasslands and heath. These varied habitats support many species of plant, bird and insect.

Muxton Marsh
Muxton Marsh, within the reserve, is designated a Site of Special Scientific Interest. The western end is an uncultivated meadow, with plant species including yellow rattle, meadow vetchling and marsh thistle. The eastern end is wetter, a habitat for rushes, sedges and marsh arrow-grass. The eastern part includes the slopes of a former pit mound, where there is now woodland with alder and willow at its foot by the marsh.

Remains of industry
The remains of blast furnaces, a tub boat canal and a winding engine house can be seen.

The blast furnaces were the Old Lodge Furnaces, built by the Lilleshall Company, near an old hunting lodge that was demolished in 1820. They were in use from 1824 until 1888; they were demolished in 1905. Part of the brickwork of three of the furnaces remain.

References

External links
 Granville Heritage Trail leaflet
 Granville Nature Reserve leaflet

Local Nature Reserves in Shropshire
Industrial archaeological sites in Shropshire
Telford